Abdelmalek Slahdji (born 8 August 1983) is an Algerian handball goalkeeper for GS Pétroliers.

He competed for the Algerian national team at the 2015 World Men's Handball Championship in Qatar.

He also participated at the 2003, 2005 and 2011 World Championships.

References

1983 births
Living people
Algerian male handball players
Sportspeople from Algiers
21st-century Algerian people